The following detailed sequence of events covers the timeline of Cluj-Napoca, a city in Transylvania, Romania.

Throughout its long history, the area around Cluj-Napoca was part of many empires and kingdoms, including the Roman Empire (as part of the Dacia province and later a sub-division of Dacia Porolissensis), Gepidia, Avaria, the Hungarian Kingdom, the Habsburg monarchy, Austria-Hungary and the Kingdom of Romania. From 1790 to 1848 and 1861–1867, it was the official capital of the Grand Principality of Transylvania.

In modern times, the city holds the status of municipiu, is the seat of Cluj County in the north-western part of Romania, and continues to be considered the unofficial capital of the historical province of Transylvania. Cluj continues to be one of the most important academic, cultural, industrial and business centres in Romania. Among other institutions, it hosts the country's largest university, Babeș-Bolyai University, with its famous botanical garden. The Cluj-Napoca metropolitan area has a population of 411,379 people, while the population of the peri-urban area exceeds 420,000 residents, making it one of the most populous cities in Romania.

2nd century

 101 – After gaining support from the Roman Senate, emperor Trajan leads the Roman legions across the Danube into Dacia, starting the First Dacian War.
 102 – Hostilities between Roman Empire and Dacian Kingdom cease and the two parties reach a peace agreement.
 105 – Trajan starts the second Dacian campaign with aim of expansion and conquest.
 105–106 – During the second campaign, the Romans build Castra of Napoca.
 106 – 11 August
 the territories annexed from the Kingdom of Dacia officially become the imperial province of Dacia.
 Decimus Terentius Scaurianus, who commanded legions during the Dacian wars, is named the propraetorian governor.
 107
 After a directive from Trajan, Cohors I Hispanorum miliaria begins the work to connect Napoca with Potaissa (as part of via Traiana Pataesina), along the pre-existing salt road.
 June: Trajan returns to Rome after the successful Dacian campaign, starting a series of celebrations.
 108
 Napoca is mentioned as a vicus, an ad hoc provincial civilian settlement, which sprang up close to the military castra.
 The work to the Roman road connecting Napoca to Potaissa finishes, increasing significantly the importance of Napoca
 The town becomes the end of the central spine from which all of the Roman forts in Northwest Dacia can be reached.
 c.108–124
 A bridge is constructed across Samus River.
 A brooch workshop is built using timber.
 Town starts to extend to the south, and the surveyors begin to lay out the main streets: decumanus maximus (east-west) and the cardo (north-south).
 117
 8 August: Trajan dies in Selinus, Cilicia
 10 August: Hadrian becomes Roman Emperor
 118 – After the battles with Roxolani and the Iazyges where Hadrian himself participates, the provinces of Moesia and Dacia are reorganized, Trajan's original province of Dacia being relabelled Dacia Superior.
 124
 Emperor Hadrian visits Napoca in Dacia, grants the title and rank of municipium (as municipium Aelium Hadrianum Napocenses) and attaches it to his tribe, the Sergia.
 Province of Dacia is reorganized, and an additional province called Dacia Porolissensis is created in the northern portion of Dacia Superior
 Napoca becomes the location of the military high command in Dacia Porolissensis and its capital.
 Livius Gratus becomes procurator of Dacia Porolissensis.
 131 – Flavius Italicus becomes procurator of Dacia Porolissensis.
 138 – 11 July: Antoninus Pius becomes emperor at Hadrian's death.
 151 – Marcus Macrinius Vindex becomes procurator of Dacia Porolissensis.
 157 – Tiberius Clodius Quintianus becomes procurator of Dacia Porolissensis.
 161 – 8 March: Marcus Aurelius succeeds Antoninus Pius as Emperor.
 161–162 – Volu[---] becomes procurator of Dacia Porolissensis.
 164 – Lucius Sempronius Ingenuus becomes procurator of Dacia Porolissensis.
 166
 Pressures building along the Danube frontier force Marcus Aurelius to set up an overarching province, Tres Daciae (Three Dacias), which fuses the three Dacia provinces into one and is commanded by a consular legate.
 The three provinces, including Dacia Porolissesnsis, still remain as separate entities, each one governed by a praesidial procurator, who then reports to the proconsular governor.
 Sextus Calpurnius Agricola becomes the first Legatus Augusti pro praetore (consular legate) of the Tres Daciae.
 168 – Marcus Claudius Fronto becomes the consular legate of the Three Dacias.
 170 – Sextus Cornelius Clemens becomes the consular legate of the Three Dacias.
 173 – Lucius Aemilius Carus becomes the consular legate of the Three Dacias.
 176 – Gaius Arrius Antoninus becomes the consular legate of the Three Dacias.
 177
 Marcus Aurelius bestows the title of Augustus on his son, Commodus, giving him the same status as his own and formally starting to share power.
 Publius Helvius Pertinax becomes the consular legate of the Three Dacias.
 c.178–179 – Marcus Valerius Maximianus becomes procurator of Dacia Porolissensis.
 180
 17 March: Marcus Aurelius dies and Commodus remains sole emperor
 Gaius Vettius Sabinianus Julius Hospes becomes the consular legate of the Three Dacias.
 c.180 – the city gaines the status of a colonia as Colonia Aurelia Napoca.
 c.180–190 – Gaius Valerius Catulinus becomes procurator of Dacia Porolissensis.
 c.180–192
 Eocene limestone is extracted from the stone quarries around Hoia Hill to the west of the town on a large scale.
 The city wall around the precinct is constructed using large blocks of limestone in opus quadratum, covering a surface of around 25 hectares.
 A brooch workshop is built using stone.
 182 – Lucius Vespronius Candidus becomes the consular legate of the Three Dacias.
 185
 Dacian revolt in the province, Free Dacians living outside the borders also defeated.
 c.185 – Gaius Pescennius Niger becomes the consular legate of the Three Dacias.
 c.190 – G. C(...) Hasta becomes the consular legate of the Three Dacias.
 191 – Aelius Constans becomes procurator of Dacia Porolissensis.
 192 – 31 December: Emperor Commodus is assassinated.
 193 – 14 April: Septimius Severus' legion, XIV Gemina, proclaims him Emperor.
 c.193–211: The villa rustica from Apahida (near Napoca) is in use.
 c.193 – Quintus Aurelius Polus Terentianus becomes the consular legate of the Three Dacias.
 195 – Publius Septimius Geta becomes the consular legate of the Three Dacias.
 c.197 – Pollienus Auspex becomes the consular legate of the Three Dacias.
 198 – Caracalla is appointed by his father, Septimius Severus, as joint Augustus and full Emperor.
 c.198–209 – Publius Aelius Sempronius Lycinus becomes procurator of Dacia Porolissensis.
 c.198–209 – Gaius Publicius Antonius Probus becomes procurator of Dacia Porolissensis.
 200 – Lucius Octavius Julianus becomes the consular legate of the Three Dacias.
 c.200 – Marcus Cocceius Genialis becomes procurator of Dacia Porolissensis.

3rd century

 c.200–230 – Marcus Veracilius Verus becomes the consular legate of the Three Dacias.
 204 – Lucius Pomponius Liberalis becomes the consular legate of the Three Dacias.
 205 – Mevius Surus becomes the consular legate of the Three Dacias.
 206 – Claudius Gallus becomes the consular legate of the Three Dacias.
 208 – Gaius Julius Maximinus becomes the consular legate of the Three Dacias.
 211 – 4 February: Caracalla and his brother Geta reign together after their father's death.
 c.211–217 – The road from Napoca to Porolissum is repaired.
 212 – Lucius Marius Perpetuus becomes the consular legate of the Three Dacias.
 215 – Gaius Julius Septimius Castinus becomes the consular legate of the Three Dacias.
 217 – Marcus Claudius Agrippa becomes the consular legate of the Three Dacias.
 c.217 – Ulpius Victor becomes procurator of Dacia Porolissensis.
 222 – 11 March: Severus Alexander becomes Emperor.
 c.222 – Iasdius Domitianus becomes the consular legate of the Three Dacias.
 235 – 20 March 235: Maximinus Thrax succeeds to the rule of Roman Empire, after Severus Alexander is assassinated.
 c.235–238 – Quintus Julius Licinianus becomes the consular legate of the Three Dacias.
 c.235–238 – Marcus Cuspidius Flaminius Severus becomes the consular legate of the Three Dacias.
 c.235–238  – Decimus Simonius Proculus Julianus becomes the consular legate of the Three Dacias.
 236–238 – Maximinus Thrax campaigns in Dacia against the Carpi.
 c.238 – Decimus Simonius Proculus Julianus becomes the consular legate of the Three Dacias.
 242–247 – Carpi are attacking Dacia and Moesia Inferior.
 248–250 – Dacia is attacked by the Germanic tribes of the Goths, Taifals and Bastarns together with the Carpi.
 253
 22 October: Gallienus and Valerian start ruling jointly the Roman Empire.
 Monetary circulation starts to decrease in Dacia and Pannonia.
 257 – Gallienus claims the title Dacicus Maximus after repeated victories over the Carpi and associated Dacian tribes.
 258 – Dacia is attacked by Carpi and Goths.
 258–260 – A percentage of the cohorts from the V Macedonica and XIII Gemina legions are transferred from Dacia to Pannonia.
 260 – Monetary circulation and raising of inscribed monuments have a dramatic drop in Dacia.
 c.260 – Repairs of the castra fortifications are conducted on the northern border of Dacia Porolissensis.
 263 – Dacia is attacked by Carpi and Goths.
 267 – Dacia is attacked by Goths and Herules.
 269 – Dacia is attacked by Goths and Herules.
 270 – September: Aurelian becomes Roman Emperor.
 271–275 – Aurelian evacuates the Roman troops and civilian administration from Dacia, and establishes Dacia Aureliana with its capital at Serdica in Lower Moesia.
 c.291
 Goths, including Thervingi, begin to move into the former province of Dacia.
 Victohali, a subdivision of Hasdingi (themselves southern Vandals), push from north and west into north west of Dacia.
 Taifals join Thervingi to fight Victohali and Gepids over the possession of Samus valley.
 Gepids mentioned for the first time.
 291–300 – Thervingi continue migrating into north-eastern Dacia but are opposed by the Carpi and the non-Romanized Dacians.
 c.295 – Goths defeat the Carpi, pushing them southward.

4th century
 295-320s – After a peace treaty with the Romans, Goths proceed to settle down in parts of Roman Dacia (starting to be called Gothia), dividing some of the land with the Taifals, and co-existing with the remaining semi-Romanized population.
 c.300–350 – Ruralization of the urban life in Dacia.
 c.350 – Sântana de Mureş-Černjachov culture/Goths enter intra-Carpathian Transylvania.
 376 – Huns arrive, attacking the Thervingi and leading to a collapse of the Gothic dominance in the area.

5th century

 c.401–420 – Gepidic center on the plains north-west of the Meseş Mountains.
 420s – Huns impose their authority over the Gepids, but the latter remain united under the rule of their kings.
 c.440 – Ardaric, favored by the Hunic king, becomes the leader of the Gepids.
 c.435–453 – Huns fight the Alans, Vandals, and Quadi, forcing them toward the Roman Empire and making Pannonia their center.
 453 – Attila, King of the Huns dies and the Hunnic Empire starts to disintegrate.
 c.454
 Ardaric initiates an uprising of the Gepids against the Huns.
 Gepids defeat the Huns in Pannonia, regain their independence and are able to start to expand eastwards, into Dacia.
 c.475–500
 Gepid power centers start to develop in Transylvania.
 Major, wealthy Gepid center at Apahida, near Napoca, having connections with the Eastern Roman Empire.

6th century
 c.501–568
 More Gepid power centers appear in Transylvania.
 New settlements appear along the Someş, Mureş, and Târnava rivers, reflecting a period of tranquillity in Gepidia.
 A "circle" of Gepid settlements develops around Napoca.
 Gepids start to adopt Arian Christianity through their connection with the Goths.
 Farming is the primary activity, but looms, combs, and other items are produced in local workshops.
 Gepidia is trading with faraway regions such as Crimea, Mazovia or Scandinavia.
 568 – The Avar invasion ends the independent Gepidia.
 c.568 – Carpathian Basin is incorporated in the Avar Khaganate established by khagan Bayan I.
 c.599–600 – Gepids under assimilation but settlements still exist within Avaria.

7th century

 c.600–800 – Avars bring with them and allow Slavs to settle inside Transylvania.

8th century
 c. 700–800 – Center and northern Transylvania under Moravian influence.
 791–795 – Plunder of the Avar state by the Franks of Charlemagne.
 794 – Avars, in small numbers, and mixed with Slavs, still inhabit parts of Transylvania.
 796 – Avar Khaganate suffers a crippling blow by the Franks.

9th century
 c.796–803 – Bulgars under Khan Krum unite with Franks to crush the Avar Khaganate.
 c.803
 Transylvanian Avars are subjugated by the Bulgars under Khan Krum
 Transylvania and eastern Pannonia are incorporated into the First Bulgarian Empire.
 Salt mines of Transylvania under Bulgar control.
 c.850–900
 Gelou, "a certain Vlach" and "prince of the Vlachs", is ruling in Transylvania, the Gesta Hungarorum mention indicating that the Vlachs were considered the dominant Transylvanian population.
 Pechenegs are raiding the Duchy of Gelou.

10th century

 c. 895–902 – Magyars (Hungarians) commence the conquest of the Carpathian Basin defeating and conquering the lands of Menumorut and later Gelou
 c. 900–1000
 A small settlement appears on the ruins of Roman Napoca covering less than 3rd of the ancient site, with Roman fortifications being used as a source of construction materials.
 The settlement has four unequal sides (northern side 250 m, western side 223 m, southern side 300m, eastern side 197 m).
 A cemetery is active 600–1300 m from Napoca.
 1000 – Area becomes part of the Kingdom of Hungary, as Stephen I of Hungary is crowned as the first king and adopts Christianity.

11th century
 c. 1001–1038
 Stephen I establishes an administrative system of counties based on fortresses (or comitati) using the French model, with four of them in Transylvania, including the Kolozs County.
 Each county (or comitatus (Latin)) is led by a count (comes (Latin) or Ispán (Hungarian)).
 The new Ispán of Kolozs (comes Clusiensis) is responsible with the protection of the salt production in nearby Koloszokna.
 A fort is erected at Kolozsmonostor (3 km from the ancient Napoca) to serve as the count's residence.
 1009 – Diocese of Transylvania is established.
 1068 – Kolozsmonostor fort and settlement are destroyed by fire during an incursion of the Pechenegs in Transylvania.
 1080s–1090s
 Kolozsmonostor fort reconstructed, having its earth-and-beam wall raised by three metres.
 Ladislaus I of Hungary settles Benedictine monks on the fort premises, who establish Kolozsmonostor Abbey, the first Benedictine monastery in Transylvania.
 First church is constructed in Kolozs.

12th century
 1111–1113 – Mercurius, a distinguished nobleman who held the office during the reign of Coloman, King of Hungary (1095–1116), is mentioned in two royal charters as "princeps Ultrasilvanus" (perhaps the first known Voivode of Transylvania)
 1143 – The colonization of Transylvania by Germans commences under the reign of King Géza II of Hungary (1141–1162)
 1173 – Clus as a county name is recorded for the first time, in a document which mentions Thomas comes Clusiensis
 1176 – Leustach of the Rátót clan becomes Voivode of Transylvania.
 1178 – Site "colonized" by newly arrived "Saxons".
 1199 – Legforus becomes Voivode of Transylvania.

13th century

 1213 – The first written mention of the city's current name – as a Royal Borough – under the Medieval Latin name Castrum Clus.
 1241 – Both Kolozs and Kolozsmonostor are destroyed during First Mongol invasion of Hungary, with very few survivors.
 1246 – The first recording for the Hungarian form Kolozsvár (uar / vár means "castle" in Hungarian).
 c. 1242–1275 – More German colonists arrive from Rhineland and Flanders, and are working to rebuild the fortress of Kolozs.
 1275 – In a document of King Ladislaus IV of Hungary, the village (Villa Kulusvar) is granted to Peter Monoszló, the Bishop of Transylvania.
 c. 1260–1290 – A new church in built in Kolozs in Late Romanesque style, on the site of the destroyed first church, and then starts to serve as the parochial church.
 1285–1286 – Second Mongol invasion of Hungary

14th century

 1316
 19 August: King Charles I of Hungary grants the status of a city (Latin: civitas), as a reward for the Saxons' contribution to the defeat of the rebellious Transylvanian voivode, Ladislaus Kán.
 Groundbreaking for the St. Michael's Church
 1332 – The first appearance of the Hungarian form Koloswar, as it underwent various phonetic changes over the years.
 1348 – First usage of the Transylvanian Saxon name of Clusenburg/Clusenbvrg appeared.
 1349 – A document signed by the archbishop of Avignon and fifteen other bishops grants the indulgence for those contributing to the illumination and furniture of the St. Michael's Church.
 1377 – King Louis I of Hungary grants to Cluj the coat of arms and seal, consisting of three towers, a city wall with a gate in silver on a blue background.
 1390
 The altar of St. Michael's Church is inaugurated and the church starts to be used as the new parochial church of Kolozs.
 The original church from the Old Town is given to friars of the Dominican Order.

15th century

 1405 – Through the privileges granted by Sigismund of Luxembourg, Cluj becomes a royal free city, is opting out from the jurisdiction of voivodes, vice-voivodes and royal judges, and obtains the right to elect a twelve-member jury every year.
 1408 – First mention of the Transylvanian Saxon form Clausenburg.
 1432 – St. Michael's Church is completed.
 1442 – Dominican friars begin the construction of their monastery and to rebuild the old church in Gothic style.
 1443 – 23 February: Matthias Corvinus is born in Cluj.
 1445 – John Hunyadi starts supporting the construction efforts of the Dominican friars, offering a guaranteed income of 50 cubes of salt from the salt mine of Szék.
 1464 – 29 April: Matthias Corvinus becomes King of Hungary.
 1481 – First record of the presence of Jews living in Cluj.

16th century
 1511–1545 – Tower of St. Michael's Church is built.
 1541 – City stays in Eastern Hungarian Kingdom after the Ottoman Turks occupied the central part of the Kingdom of Hungary.
 1543 – Bonțida Bánffy Castle built near city.
 1544 – Kaspar Helth, a Transylvanian Saxon who studied at Wittenberg University, comes to Kolozsvár as a Lutheran preacher, marking the arrival of Reformation in the city.
 1550 – Printing press is established in the city by Kaspar Helth.
 1565 – Witch trials begin.
 1568 – Unitarian Church of Transylvania is founded by Dávid Ferenc, who was previously a Catholic priest, later a Lutheran one and then a Calvinist bishop
 1570 – City becomes part of the independent Principality of Transylvania, established through the Treaty of Speyer
 1572 –  built in Big Market Square.
 1581 – Gymnasium (school) founded.
 1593 – Witch trials end, with thirteen people being burned.

17th century

 1615 – Witch-hunt starts.
 1629 – Witch-hunt ends.
 1695 – Hungarian Szakácskönyv (cookbook) published.
 1699 – City becomes part of the Habsburg monarchy per Treaty of Karlowitz.

18th century
 1715 – Construction of the  begins.
 1785
 Bánffy Palace built.
 Gherla Prison begins operating in vicinity.
 1790 – City becomes capital of the Grand Principality of Transylvania.
 1792 – Hungarian Theatre founded.
 1798 – Large parts of the city destroyed by fire.

19th century

 1803 – Bob Church consecrated.
 1812 –  built.
 1828 –  expanded.
 1829 – Evangelical-Lutheran Church built.
 1830s – Népkertnek Park (Central Park) opens.
 1845 – Town Hall built.
 1848 – 25 December: City taken by Hungarian forces.
 1869 – Institute of Agronomic Studies founded.
 1870
 Railway to Budapest begins operating.
 Population: 26,382.
 1872 – Franz Joseph University and Botanical Garden founded.
 1880 – Population: 29,923 (70% of Hungarian ethnicity).
 1887 – Neolog Synagogue built.
 1890 – Population: 32,739.
 1895 –  built.
 1900 – Population: 46,670.

20th century

 1902
 Palace of Justice built.
 Matthias Corvinus Monument unveiled in Big Market Square.
 1906 – Cluj-Napoca National Theatre opens.
 1907 – CFR Cluj (football club) formed.
 1910 – Hungarian Theatre of Cluj building constructed.
 1911 – Ion Moina Stadium opens.
 1913 –  built in Big Market Square.
 1918
 1 December: Union of Transylvania with Romania is declared
 24 December: City taken by Romanian forces; Hungarian rule ends.
 1919
 Iulian Pop becomes the first Romanian mayor.
 U Cluj football club formed.
 Gheorghe Dima Music Academy founded.
 Iuliu Hațieganu University of Medicine and Pharmacy (Romanian: Universitatea de Medicină și Farmacie "Iuliu Hațieganu", or UMF Cluj) in Cluj-Napoca, Romania, is the oldest medical education institution in Transylvania, a continuation of the Faculty of Medicine which was founded in 1919, as a part of the Superior Dacia University. 
 1920
 Based on the Treaty of Trianon, Cluj becomes part of the Kingdom of Romania.
 Population: 85,509.
 1921 – 28 September: Capitoline Wolf Statue, a gift from Italy to Romania as a symbol for its Latinity, unveiled in Unirii Square.
 1922 – Ethnographic Museum of Transylvania founded.
 1925 – Fine Arts School founded.
 1930
 Greek Catholic Diocese of Cluj-Gherla established.
 Population: 100,844.
 1933 – Dormition of the Theotokos Cathedral (Romanian Orthodox) built.
 1934 – Goldmark Jewish Symphonic Orchestra founded.
 1940 – City becomes part of Hungary again.
 1944
 27 March: City occupied by German forces.
 25 May: Deportation of Jews begins.
 11 October: City captured by Romanian and Soviet forces; Hungarian rule ends.
 1948
 Protestant Theological Institute established.
 Population: 117,915.
 1966 – Population: 185,663 (56% of Romanian ethnicity; 42% of Hungarian ethnicity).
 1968 –  literary magazine begins publication.
 1973 – CFR Cluj Stadium opens.
 1974
 City renamed to "Cluj-Napoca".
 Population: 218,703.
 1989 – December: Romanian Revolution.
 1992
 Gheorghe Funar becomes mayor.
 Population: 328,602 (75% of Romanian ethnicity).
 1994 – Association for Interethnic Dialogue established in Cluj.

21st century
 2001 – Peace Action, Training and Research Institute of Romania (PATRIR) founded.
 2004 – Emil Boc becomes mayor.
 2008
 Sorin Apostu becomes mayor.
 Cluj-Napoca metropolitan area created.
 20 November: Demolition of Ion Moina Stadium starts.
 2009 – 16 July: Construction of the new stadium, Cluj Arena, begins on the site of demolished Ion Moina Stadium.
 2011
 Population: 324,576 city; 411,379 metro.
 11 October: Cluj Arena opens
 2012 – Emil Boc becomes mayor again.
 2015 – Holds the title of European Youth Capital.
 2016 – Emil Boc becomes mayor yet again.
 2018 – Holds the title of European City of Sport.

See also

 History of Cluj-Napoca
 Historical chronology of Cluj (in Romanian)
 Napoca (castra)
 Roman Dacia
 List of mayors of Cluj-Napoca
 List of places in Cluj-Napoca
 Other names of Cluj-Napoca
 Timeline of Romanian history

References

Sources

Primary sources

Secondary sources

Tertiary sources

External links

 Europeana. Items related to Cluj, various dates.
 Digital Public Library of America. Items related to Cluj, various dates

 
Cluj
Years in Romania